Afroarctia kenyana is a moth of the  family Erebidae. It was described by Rothschild in 1933. It is found in Kenya, Uganda, Rwanda, Zaire and Cameroon.

References

Moths described in 1933
Erebid moths of Africa
Spilosomina